Priesitz is a village and a former municipality in Wittenberg district in Saxony-Anhalt, Germany. Since 1 July 2009, it is part of the town Bad Schmiedeberg.

Geography 
Priesitz lies about 25 kilometers southeast of Lutherstadt Wittenberg in the glacial valley of the Elbe at the edge of the Düben Heath Nature Park.

Subdivisions
Priesitz has one of these: Sachau.

History 
Priesitz had its first documentary mention in 1290.

Regular events 
Every year, the Lake Festival (Seefest) is held in early July as a village festival.

Economy and transportation
Federal Highway (Bundesstraße) B 182, which joins Torgau and Wittenberg lies about 0.5 km away. The railway line between Torgau and Pretzsch has a stop in Sachau.

External links 
Verwaltungsgemeinschaft's website

Former municipalities in Saxony-Anhalt
Bad Schmiedeberg